The Carbunup River is located in the south-west corner of Western Australia.

The nearest water courses are Mary Brook to the west and Buayanyup River to the east; both of these rivers travel parallel to the Carbunup River. The Carbunup River is located in the Leeuwin-Naturaliste area where it crosses two physiographic regions, the 15 km wide Swan Coastal Plain and the gently undulating Blackwood Plateau.

The only tributary of the river is Island Brook.

History 
The river was originally named the Lennox River after Lennox Bussell by Captain John Molloy in 1835.
The name was changed to Carbunup River, the local Aboriginal word that means either "place of a kindly stream", "place of cormorants" or "place of the stinkwood thicket".

References

Rivers of the South West region